Kah Kesh (also Romanized as Kāh Kesh and Kāh Kash; also known as Kākhesh) is a village in Saman Rural District, Saman County, Chaharmahal and Bakhtiari Province, Iran. At the 2006 census, its population was 773, in 206 families. The village is populated by Turkic people.

References 

Populated places in Saman County